Bree is a village located in the centre of County Wexford, in Ireland. As of the 2016 census, Bree had a population of 193 people.

History
There is a well-preserved portal tomb (sometimes called a dolmen) located nearby at Ballybrittas, on Bree Hill, which dates from the Neolithic period.

Sir James Keating, Prior of the Order of Knights Hospitaller and a leading member of the Irish government, was born here in the early years of the 15th century.

Amenities
The village contains a primary school, a community centre, a GAA pitch, a soccer club Bree United and a Roman Catholic church (the Church of the Assumption) and an adjoining cemetery.

A Protestant church is also located nearby. This is Clonmore Church of Ireland church, and it was erected in 1827. It also has an adjoining cemetery.

People
Paul Kehoe, politician and TD

See also
 List of towns and villages in Ireland

References 

Towns and villages in County Wexford